Ada is a village in Šodolovci, Osijek-Baranja County, Croatia. The settlement was originally a pustara, a Pannonian type of hamlet.

It is connected by the D518 road.

References

Populated places in Osijek-Baranja County
Populated places in Syrmia
Joint Council of Municipalities
Serb communities in Croatia